Roscoea schneideriana  is a perennial herbaceous plant found in China, in Tibet, Sichuan and Yunnan. Most members of the ginger family (Zingiberaceae), to which it belongs, are tropical, but R. schneideriana, like other species of Roscoea, grows in much colder mountainous regions.

Description

Roscoea schneideriana  is a perennial herbaceous plant. Like all members of the genus Roscoea, it dies back each year to a short vertical rhizome, to which are attached the tuberous roots. When growth begins again, "pseudostems" are produced: structures which resemble stems but are actually formed from the tightly wrapped bases (sheaths) of its leaves.

Flowers appear in July to August in the wild. The stem (peduncle) of the flower spike (inflorescence) is either held within the leaf sheaths or sometimes slightly extended from them. The flowers usually open one at a time and are purple or white.

Each flower has the typical structure for Roscoea (see the diagrams in that article). The labellum does not bend downwards and is split into two lobes for about half its length.

The stigma is funnel-shaped.

Taxonomy

Roscoea schneideriana was first described by Ludwig Loesener in 1923 as R. yunnanensis var. schneideriana. (R. yunnanensis is now regarded as a synonym of R. cautleyoides.) Jill Cowley raised it to a full species in 1982.

Evolution and phylogeny

The family Zingiberaceae is mainly tropical in distribution. The unusual mountainous distribution of Roscoea may have evolved relatively recently and be a response to the uplift taking place in the region in the last 50 million years or so due to the collision of the Indian and Asian tectonic plates.

Species of Roscoea divide into two clear groups, a Himalayan clade and a "Chinese" clade (which includes some species from outside China). The two clades correspond to a geographical separation, being divided by the Brahmaputra River as it flows south at the end of the Himalayan mountain chain. It has been suggested that the genus may have originated in this area and then spread westwards along the Himalayas and eastwards into the mountains of China and its southern neighbours. R. schneideriana is in the Chinese clade, as would be expected from its distribution.

Distribution and habitat

References

schneideriana
Flora of Tibet
Plants described in 1923
Flora of Sichuan
Flora of Yunnan